Lights of Paris (French: Lumières de Paris) is a 1938 French musical comedy film directed by Richard Pottier and starring Tino Rossi, Michèle Alfa and Raymond Cordy.

It was shot at Pathé's Joinville Studios in Paris. The film's sets were designed by the art director Andrej Andrejew.

Synopsis
A celebrated singer in Paris meets a young woman and courts her by pretending to be a driving instructor.

Cast
 Tino Rossi as Carlo Ferrari
 Michèle Alfa as Renée
 Raymond Cordy as Toto
 Marie Bizet as Yvonne
 Georges Flateau as Joe Parker
 Félix Oudart as Le directeur de casino
 Conchita Montenegro as Pénélopeia - la danseuse
 Moïse Simons as Pianiste
 Fred Pasquali as Beaurivage
 Guy Sloux as 	Le manager
 Julien Carette as 	Le vendeur de postes
 Doumel as Le manager
 Raymond Bussières 	
 Irène Corday		
 Claire Gérard		
 Liliane Lesaffre	
 Franck Maurice
 Émile Riandreys

References

Bibliography 
 Rège, Philippe . Encyclopedia of French Film Directors, Volume 1. Scarecrow Press, 2009.

External links 
 

1938 films
1938 musical comedy films
French musical comedy films
1938 comedy films
1930s French-language films
Films directed by Richard Pottier
Films shot at Joinville Studios
Films set in Paris
1930s French films